Ovidiu Olteanu (born 6 August 1970) is a retired Romanian athlete who competed in middle-distance events. He represented his country at the 1996 Summer Olympics, as well as two outdoor and two indoor World Championships. His biggest success was the silver medal in the 3000 metres at the 1994 European Indoor Championships.

Competition record

Personal bests
Outdoor
1500 metres – 3:38.33 (Atlanta 1996)
One mile – 3:58.18 (Bucharest 1994)
3000 metres – 7:53.83 (Zagreb 1995)
5000 metres – 13:33.80 (Bucharest 1994)
Indoor
1500 metres – 3:44.89 (Moscow 1996)
3000 metres – 7:48.47 (Budapest 1998) NR

References

1970 births
Living people
Romanian male middle-distance runners
Olympic athletes of Romania
Athletes (track and field) at the 1996 Summer Olympics
World Athletics Championships athletes for Romania